Rhiannon Henry (born 20 May 1987) is a Welsh swimmer, paracyclist and paratriathlete who has competed in the Paralympic Games on three occasions winning two medals in swimming events. She also won World and European Championship medals as a swimmer. However, after coming away from the 2012 Summer Paralympics in London without a medal, she switched to paracyling and joined the British Cycling Paralympic Academy programme, competing as a visually-impaired rider as part of a tandem pairing. She made her debut alongside Fiona Duncan at the 2013 Tandem Tour of Belgium, finishing sixth and helping teammates Lora Turnham and Corinne Hall to victory.

Henry represented Wales at the Commonwealth Games in Glasgow, 2014 where she rode with pilot Rachel James. She teamed up with Lauryn Therin at the 2014 British National Track Championships, where they finished second in the blind and visually impaired para-cycling pursuit.

Henry switched to triathlon in late 2014 and began training with the Great Britain Paratriathlon squad. She won her first ever race at the World Paratriathlon Event in East London, South Africa where she was piloted by Nicole Walters.

Notes

1987 births
Living people
Commonwealth Games competitors for Wales
Cyclists at the 2014 Commonwealth Games
British female backstroke swimmers
British female butterfly swimmers
British female medley swimmers
Medalists at the 2004 Summer Paralympics
Medalists at the World Para Swimming Championships
Paralympic bronze medalists for Great Britain
Paralympic medalists in swimming
Paralympic swimmers of Great Britain
S13-classified Paralympic swimmers
Sportspeople from Bridgend
Swimmers at the 2004 Summer Paralympics
Swimmers at the 2006 Commonwealth Games
Swimmers at the 2008 Summer Paralympics
Swimmers at the 2012 Summer Paralympics
Welsh female cyclists
Welsh female freestyle swimmers
Welsh female swimmers